Christ Clone Trilogy is a Christian science fiction trilogy by the American novelist James BeauSeigneur, dealing with the end of the world by presenting a fictionalized version of Christian eschatology.

BeauSeigneur's writing is compared to much more name recognized contemporaries, such as Tom Clancy, for its attention to detail. The series has also been compared to the better-known Left Behind series of novels, as both deal with the concepts of the Rapture, the Antichrist, and the Second Coming of Jesus.

Components of the trilogy
In His Image
Birth of an Age
Acts of God

Plot
The trilogy starts with In His Image, where living human cells discovered on the Turin shroud are used to clone a child, Christopher Goodman. The book follows Goodman's story by telling the tale of Decker Hawthorne, a journalist and the main character of the series. Among the main events covered in this book are the creation of Christopher, the rapture and Christopher's progress to becoming a key figure in the United Nations.

The trilogy continues with the Birth of an Age, in which a series of disasters and plagues assault the earth and its inhabitants. Towards the end of this book, Christopher is killed and then resurrected.

Finally in Acts of God, there is coverage of further natural disasters and the realization of Christopher's true identity and motives. This book follows through to the end of the world and life afterwards.

Characters

Major characters
Decker Hawthorne

Decker is the main protagonist in the series. Decker is a Vietnam veteran who becomes a journalist and world traveler. Good-natured but ambitious Decker grows more and more successful throughout the series, and ends up as Chief of Staff for the Secretary-General of the United Nations. The Secretary-General happens to be Christopher Goodman, his foster son, and prophesied Antichrist of the Revelation.

Christopher Goodman

Christopher Goodman is the titular Christ Clone within the trilogy. Living dermal cells are obtained from the Shroud of Turin and are cloned by Professor Harry Goodman, who wanted to study cells which are resistant enough to remain healthy after 2000 years. The series, told mostly from Decker Hawthorne's point of view, chronicles the life of Christopher Goodman, his rise to political and spiritual power.

Robert Milner

Robert Milner is a former Secretary-General of the United Nations who served as Christopher's spiritual mentor and moral compass during his early adulthood, and remains one of Christopher's closest advisors, confidents and friends. Milner is approaching 100 years of age, however, due to a transfusion of Christopher's blood, he appears as a vital man in his middle years, at the peak of health. He is Christopher's right-hand man in matters of faith and spirituality.

Minor characters
Alice Bernley
Harry Goodman
Martha Goodman
Elizabeth Hawthorne
Joshua and Ilyena Rosen
Scott Rosen
Saul Cohen
Ben Cohen
Rebbe Chaim Levin
John (Yochanan bar Zebadee)
Albert Faure
Gerard Poupardin
Jon Hansen
Jackie Hansen
Tom Donafin
Rhoda Donafin

See also
Punk Rock Jesus

References

External links
Review of the trilogy by Jackie Alnor
Review of the trilogy by Jay Carper

American Christian novels
Apocalyptic novels
Christian science fiction
Novelistic portrayals of Jesus
Novels about cloning
Novels about the Antichrist
Novel series
Science fiction book series